Aegopodium is a plant genus of the family Apiaceae native to Europe and western Asia. It is represented by about seven species, all are perennial herbs. Flowers are compounded, umbels appearing in spring-summer and are visited by many types of insect pollinators. Fruit consists of two-winged or ribbed nuts that separate on ripening.

The most well-known member is the Aegopodium podagraria, the ground elder also known as snow-on-the-mountain, Bishop's weed, goutweed, native to Europe and Asia. It is variegated green and white that sometimes reverts to solid green within a patch. Small, white, five-petal flowers are held about three feet high, above the leaves, in flat topped clusters. Underground are long white branching rhizomes that vaguely resemble quackgrass. Regarded as an ecological threat, goutweed is aggressive, invasive and forms dense patches reducing species diversity in the ground layer. On the other hand, because of this, it is often used as a low maintenance ground cover.

Cultivation 
Plants from this genus are frost hardy but drought tender, preferring moist well-drained soil in an open sunny position. They can be propagated from seed or rhizome.

Species 
 Aegopodium alpestre
 Aegopodium handelii
 Aegopodium henryi
 Aegopodium kashmiricum
 Aegopodium latifolium
 Aegopodium podagraria
 Aegopodium tadshikorum

References 

 Lord, Tony, Flora: The Gardener's Bible, Cassell (London),2003

External links 
 https://web.archive.org/web/20131001231720/http://www.dcnr.state.pa.us/forestry/invasivetutorial/Goutweed.htm
 http://www.homolaicus.com/scienza/erbario/utility/botanica_sistematica/hypertext/0035.htm#000000 Botanica Sistematica

Apioideae
Apioideae genera